Ronald Turner (19 June 1885 – 15 August 1915) was an English cricketer. Turner's batting style is unknown. He was also an amateur association footballer.

Born at Gillingham, Kent, Turner was the son of the Reverend Robert Stobbs Turner and Catherine Mary Turner, living with his parents at Tewkesbury, Gloucestershire. He later attended Queens' College, Cambridge, where he gained a Blue in football and played for the England national amateur football team. In cricket, Turner made his first-class debut for Gloucestershire against Cambridge University at Fenner's in 1906. He then made two further first-class appearances in that seasons County Championship against Somerset and Surrey. He scored 30 runs at an average of 5.00, with a high score of 19. Turner later served in World War I with The Essex Regiment as a 2nd Lieutenant and saw action in the Landing at Suvla Bay by British XI Corps on 6 August 1915. He was killed in action during a night time patrol on 15 August, the last day of the landing.

References

External links
Ronald Turner at ESPNcricinfo
Ronald Turner at CricketArchive

1885 births
1915 deaths
Gallipoli campaign
Military personnel from Kent
People from Gillingham, Kent
Alumni of Queens' College, Cambridge
English footballers
Cambridge University A.F.C. players
England amateur international footballers
English cricketers
Gloucestershire cricketers
British Army personnel of World War I
Essex Regiment officers
British military personnel killed in World War I
Association footballers not categorized by position